William Everard Pedley (16 June 1858 – 9 July 1920) was an English civil engineer and cricketer who played first-class cricket for Sussex. After emigrating to the United States he became a well known irrigation engineer in Southern California. He gave his name to the community of Pedley, California, now a neighborhood within the city of Jurupa Valley, California.

England
Pedley was born at Stubbing Court, Wingerworth, Derbyshire, the son of Thomas Humphrey Pedley and his wife Mary Gully, daughter of John Gully. He joined the Royal Engineers and in 1877 became a member of the Institution of Civil Engineers. In 1879 Pedley played two matches for Sussex against Kent and Surrey. Against Kent he took 7 for 36 and was not out on 16 in his second innings to help Sussex to victory. He also played for the Royal Engineers and Gentlemen of Sussex. Pedley next appeared playing for his native Derbyshire in the 1888 season.

California
Pedley went to America where he was manager of the San Jacinto Land Company, who developed part of the Sobrante de San Jacinto land grant at Riverside, California.  He was the designer, builder, and engineer of the irrigation system that was installed. He gave his name to the settlement of Pedley, California in 1903 or 1904 when the Union Pacific Railroad Company installed a switch and a railroad station at the location. His name was also given to the nearby Pedley Hills, a low lying mountain range, also within the Jurupa Valley city limits.

Sports
In Cricket, Pedley was a right-hand batsman and played four innings in two first-class matches with an average of 15 and a top score of 16 not out. He was a right-arm medium pace bowler and took 10 first-class wickets at an average of 13.80 and a best performance of 7 for 36.

In California Pedley became a regular Polo player on the local fields and a member of the Riverside polo team, keeping his own stable of polo horses. His son, Eric became a professional player and a three-time winner of the U.S. Open Polo Championship.

Death
Pedley died in Los Angeles, California at the Good Samaritan Hospital. He was 62. While on a road trip he took ill and was taken to the Los Angeles hospital where he was diagnosed with ptomaine poisoning, and died shortly thereafter. His funeral services were held at the All Saints Episcopal Church in Riverside, and he was interred at the Olivewood Cemetery.

References

1858 births
1920 deaths
Jurupa Valley, California
History of Riverside County, California
People from Riverside, California
Burials at Olivewood Memorial Park
Sportspeople from Riverside, California
American polo players
19th-century British engineers
20th-century American engineers
Sussex cricketers
Derbyshire cricketers
English cricketers
English civil engineers
Royal Engineers officers
Cricketers from California